Ghassan Andoni (born 1956) is a native of Beit Sahour in the Bethlehem area. He is a professor of physics at Bir Zeit University, and a Palestinian Christian leader who advocates nonviolent resistance in the Israeli-Palestinian conflict. 

Andoni is co-founder of the International Solidarity Movement (ISM), founder of the International Middle East Media Centre and director of the Palestinian Center for Rapprochement between Peoples (PCR).

During the First Intifada Andoni was imprisoned for being involved in Beit Sahour’s tax revolt.  In 2006, he was nominated for the Nobel Peace Prize by the American Friends Service Committee along with Jeff Halper of the Israeli Committee Against House Demolitions (ICAHD).

See also
Palestinian Christians
List of peace activists

References

External links
The International Middle East Media Centre

Ghassan Andoni of the Palestinian Center for Rapprochement provides a history of Zionism and his organizations efforts to use nonviolent direct action to end the Israel's occupation.
On the situation in Palestine After Arafat - 2004-11-18
Sharon under Pressure:  Analysis by Ghassan Andoni - 2004-11-25

1956 births
Living people
Nonviolence advocates
Palestinian activists
Palestinian Christians
People from Beit Sahour
Tax resisters
Academic staff of Birzeit University